Jameel Khan Chamakni is a Pakistani politician who is member-elect of the Provincial Assembly of Khyber Pakhtunkhwa.

Political career
Chamakni contested 2019 Khyber Pakhtunkhwa provincial election on 20 July 2019 from constituency PK-108 (Kurram-I) as an independent. He won the election by the majority of 429 votes over the runner up Muhammad Riaz Bangash of Jamiat Ulema-e-Islam (F). He garnered 8,075 votes while Bangash received 7,646 votes.

References

Living people
Independent MPAs (Khyber Pakhtunkhwa)
Politicians from Khyber Pakhtunkhwa
Year of birth missing (living people)